Herpetologica is a quarterly peer-reviewed scientific journal published by  Allen Press on behalf of the Herpetologists' League covering herpetology. It was established in 1936 by Chapman Grant. The editor is Sarah K. Woodley (Duquesne University).

Abstracting and indexing information 
The journal is abstracted and indexed in:
BIOSIS Previews
Current Contents/Agriculture, Biology & Environmental Sciences
Science Citation Index
Scopus
The Zoological Record
According to the Journal Citation Reports, the journal has a 2021 impact factor of 2.653. According to the Scimago Journal and Country Rank, it ranks in the top quartile (Q1) in "Animal Science and Zoology" as well as "Ecology, Evolution, Behavior and Systematics".

References

External links

Herpetology journals
English-language journals
Quarterly journals
Publications established in 1936